Paul Clemence is an American-Brazilian photo-artist, focused on registering the expressive side of the built environment, particularly architecture. Beyond exhibiting his artwork, he lectures frequently and has authored several books.

Born in Hackensack, New Jersey, to parents Denis and Mária Clemence, Paul Clemence grew up in Niterói, a neighboring city to Rio de Janeiro, Brazil. Upon receiving his degree in architecture at the Federal University of Rio de Janeiro, Clemence moved to Miami Beach, Florida, where he established himself as a fine art photographer with architecture as his main subject matter. During this time, he received two consecutive awards from the American Institute of Architects/Miami Chapter and had his first book published, South Beach Architectural Photographs, featuring a black-and-white photo essay on the renowned Art Deco district.

That book was followed by Mies van der Rohe’s Farnsworth House, a photo essay on one of the pre-eminent residential projects by the German modern architect Mies van der Rohe. The book has a foreword by Mies's grandson, architect Dirk Lohan. A selection of the images in the book is part of the Mies van der Rohe's Archives, housed by the Museum of Modern Art in New York City.

In 2009, Clemence established the photo-blog page "Architectural Photography", aka Archi-Photo on Facebook, featuring highlights from his photography taken on his travels around the globe. The portfolio like blog developed into a social media community that as of 2017 has close to one million followers worldwide with an average reach of 300,000 viewers weekly. In 2015, Clemence's photo “A Tale of Two Cities” depicting the social inequalities in Rio de Janeiro through an architecture image appeared on that blog and  went viral reaching over five million viewers around the world and being shared in countless other blogs and outlets. That image has now been featured in many social studies books in Brazil.

Also in 2015, Clemence was named one of the world's Top Ten architectural photographers by Top Teny website among other acclaimed professionals.

Clemence's work reflects the subjective ways of looking at buildings, spaces and cities. In his photographs shadows, reflections, textures, patterns and transparencies are the basic elements used to create abstract compositions.

Beyond his art career, his writings and images appear often in well regarded publications like Lapman's Quarterly, Metropolis, ArchDaily, Architizer, Casa Vogue Brazil, Modern Magazine, Wallpaper Magazine, Dwell, Interior Design, Archinect, Designboom, The Design Edit, Elle Decor Italia, Architects & Artisans, Everett Potter's Travel Report, GoNomad, BBC Travel and Aishti. Clemence also lectures and conducts workshops all over the United States and abroad."I see photography as an art form, for me it is an opportunity to experience space and interpret it. It's a way to share with others how I see the world. An artistic venue for me to express my take on the built landscape and its subjective, yet definitive presence in our lives." Achievements

In 2016 Clemence's work was recognized with an invitation to be part of the official Venice Biennale collateral exhibit "Time Space Existence", organized by GAA Foundation at Palazzo Bembo at the Grand Canal. Red Interlude, his presentation at the exhibit, combined an immersive oversized floor print with traditionally hung wall photos. These images all part of a series shot at the red pool atop the Hotel Unique in São Paulo, Brazil, designed by architect Ruy Ohtake. Following the Venice Biennale, Clemence's ongoing exploration of the poetic architecture of Ohtake was also the focus of Clemence's exhibit Color + Form part of the symposium “Art About Architecture" that happens during Art Basel at the Laufen Showroom.

In 2018, Clemence was a guest speaker and exhibitor at the India Architecture Dialogues (IAD) conference that took place in new Delhi, India, alongside other prominent professionals like Iwan Baan, Helene Binet and Ram Rahman. During the conference he also conducted workshops and while in India he also spoke at both the Sushant University School of Architecture in Gurgaon and the prestigious CEPT School of Architecture in Ahmedabad.

In 2020, amidst the pandemic lockdown, Clemence celebrated the 60th anniversary of Brazil's capital, Brasília, by posting online his photo essay on the city's  most iconic buildings by the Brazilian iconic architect Oscar Niemeyer. Clemence's interpretation of the visionary architecture of Brasília appeared at Wallpaper Magazine, Everett Potter's Travel Report, and ARCHI-PHOTO.

Special Commissions

Clemence has been awarded many special art commissions. In 2017, the Art Museums of Switzerland organization commissioned him and partner Axel Stasny to create brief video interpretations of the 12 museums part of the organization, including the Beyeler Foundation, Tinguely Museum, Kunsthaus  Zurich, Kunstmuseum Basel and FotoMuseum, Zentrum Paul Klee. The series, titled "12 Impressions" included museum designs by top architects like Renzo Piano, Christ & Gantembeim, Mario Botta. The commission generated several spin off projects. First, the art exhibit "Art of the Museum", at the Swiss Consulate General New York featuring Clemence's photos of the museums. Followed that, a special edit of the footage of the two museums designed by Renzo Piano were made into the short "TWO PIANOS" that premiered at the Architecture & Design Film Festival New York.  "TWO PIANOS" was then shown at American Institute of Architects and Convention,  the Master of Art Film Festival in Sofia, Bulgaria, and in 2020 at the Venice Architecture Short Film Festival in Venice, Italy.  Furthermore, in the Fall of 2019 a selection of the images from the "Art of the Museum" exhibit were shown at the "Museum Forms" exhibit curated by Luciana Solano at the Galerie Espace L in Geneva, Switzerland.

In 2018, the state of Mato Grosso, Brazil, commissioned Clemence to document the historic landmarks of the state's capital, Cuiabá, as part of a special initiative to document and celebrate the state's history. And in 2019, the German state of Saxony invited Clemence to visit and capture some of its most architecturally relevant buildings. 

In 2019, a selection from the exhibit "Art of the Museum" portraying the Basel museums was featured at The New Museum in New York City at an event organized by the city of Basel.

Solo exhibitions

 2004, "Building Abstraction", NOW Showroom, Miami, FL
 2005, "Mies", School of Architecture at FIU, Miami,  Florida
 2006, "Farnsworth House”, Luminaire, Chicago, IL
 2008, "Construkts", Chelsea Galeria, Wynwood, Miami,  FL
 2009, "SKIN" , ArtsPark at Young Circle, Hollywood, FL
 2011, "Green Provocateur", Urban Intervention, Milan , Italy
 2011, "Architecture+Art=Photography", São Paulo, Brazil
 2012, "Future Present", Boomspdesign, São Paulo, Brazil
 2015, "Before HERE/AFTER", Parson's SCE, New York, NY
 2105, "Walk on Water",” Wanted Design, Brooklyn, NY
 2017, "Urban Beehive", with AmazeLab at Wanted Design, Brooklyn
 2018, "Art of the Museum", Swiss Consulate New York
 2020, "Brasília Diptych", Consulado-Geral do Brasil, New York
 2021, "Meditations: The Photography of Paul Clemence", Miami Beach Botanical Gardens, Miami Beach, Florida 

Group exhibitions

 2008, "Paulo Werneck, Muralista Brasileiro", Paco Imperial, Rio de Janeiro, Brazil
 2010, "Rubens Meets the Contemporary Artis", KunstMeile, Siegen, Germany
 2011, "Inventory /Soul Does Matter", DesignMiami.  Miami
 2012, "Boffo Showhouse", New York, NY
 2012, ”City Fragment" at Inventory 03, DesignMiami, Miami
 2013, "It's About Time!", Miami International Airport, Miami
 2013, "Time:04", DesignMiami / ArtBasel
 2016, "Time Space Existence", Venice Biennale, Italy
 2016, "Fall Exhibit", La Vague de St.Paul, Vence,  France
 2019, "Museum Forms", Galerie Espace L, Geneva , Switzerland
 2020, "Fotos Pró Rio", Online initiative, Rio de Janeiro, Brazil

Selected collections

 Mies van der Rohe Archives, housed by Museum of Modern Art, NY
 Farnworth House Study Center, Plano, IL
 Marriott Hotels, Miami, FL
 Riha Design Group, Cleveland , OH
 Vasari Project , Miami, FL

Selected private collections

 Martin and Cricket Taplin, Miami Beach, FL
 Mr. David Caruso, Miami Beach, FL
 Julie Davidow, Fort Lauderdale, FL
 Francie Bishop Good, Fort Lauderdale, FL
 James McKenzie, Washington, DC
 Cristiana Mascarenhas, New York, NY
 Henrique and Stephania Thoni, Niterói, Brazil
 Marcus and Christina Boeira, Ottawa, Canada
 Maurice Barrera, New York City
 John di Prizito, Long Beach, NY
 Oliver Weirich &  Stephan Stephan Stöhrer, Cologne, Germany

Awards

 1st place , 1992, American Institute of Architects/ National Photography Competition
 2nd place, 1993, American Institute of Architects/ National Photography Competition

Books

 Mies Van der Rohe's Farnsworth House. June 21, 2016. Paul Clemence. Author, Photographer
 South Beach Architectural Photographs. July 16, 2016. Paul Clemence. Author
 Miami Contemporary Artists (Schiffer Books). October 8, 2007. Paul Clemence. Author
 Here/After: Structures in Time. co-author Robert Landon, Dec. 2013

References

External links
 Paul Clemence: Abstraction Contemporary Art

Living people
Year of birth missing (living people)
People from Hackensack, New Jersey
American people of Brazilian descent
Architects from New Jersey